The 1994–95 Slovak First Football League was the second season of first-tier football league in Slovakia, since its establishment in 1993. This season started on 5 August 1994 and ended on 20 June 1995. Slovan Bratislava are the defending champions.

Teams
A total of 12 teams was contested in the league, including 11 sides from the 1993–94 season and one promoted from the 2. Liga.

FC Nitra was relegated to the 1994–95 2. Liga. The one relegated team was replaced by BSC JAS Bardejov.

Stadiums and locations

Regular season

League table

Results

Championship group

League table

Results

Relegation group

League table

Results

Relegation play-offs

|}

Season statistics

Top scorers

See also
1994–95 Slovak Cup
1994–95 2. Liga (Slovakia)

References

Slovakia - List of final tables (RSSSF)

Slovak Super Liga seasons
Slovak
1